The Enterprise Desktop Alliance (EDA) is a consortium of enterprise software vendors, engaged in the promotion of wider usage of Macs, iPhones, and iPads in Windows-dominant environments. The EDA was founded in 2008 and the  founding members include: Atempo, Centrify, GroupLogic, LANrev, and Parallels.

Member Organizations
 Absolute Software - Systems Lifecycle Management 
 GroupLogic - Mobile File Management, Enterprise File Sharing & Synching, Macintosh File & Print Services, and Managed File Transfer solutions
 Parallels - Run Windows on your Mac

References

External links
 Enterprise Device Alliance

Business software companies
Technology consortia